The Perry Farm is an intact, historic African-American farm complex in Riley Hill, North Carolina, a suburb of Raleigh. The farm house was built in 1820 by John and Nancy Perry, white slaveholders of several slaves during the Antebellum period of the South.

After the Civil War ended, a freedman named Feggins Perry made arrangements with his former enslavers to work the land as a tenant farmer.  Each night after work, Feggins made baskets and furniture for extra money so he and his brother could buy land, which was the prime goal of many freedmen.  Feggins Perry also helped establish the nearby Riley Hill Baptist Church for freedmen.

In 1914, Feggins' son Guyon Perry purchased Perry Farm.  The property remains in the family to this day.

Perry Farm was listed on the National Register of Historic Places in August 1994 as significant in African-American social history.

See also
List of Registered Historic Places in North Carolina

References

Farms on the National Register of Historic Places in North Carolina
Houses completed in 1820
Houses in Wake County, North Carolina
African-American history of North Carolina
National Register of Historic Places in Wake County, North Carolina